The Ponds is a planned community and census-designated place (CDP) in Monroe Township, Middlesex County, New Jersey, United States. It is in the southern part of the township, bordered to the west by Clearbrook, to the north and east by Concordia, and to the south by Union Valley Road.

The community was first listed as a CDP prior to the 2020 census.

Demographics

References 

Census-designated places in Middlesex County, New Jersey
Census-designated places in New Jersey
Monroe Township, Middlesex County, New Jersey